Immobilarity is the second studio album by American rapper and Wu-Tang Clan-member Raekwon, as a follow-up to Only Built 4 Cuban Linx....  It was released in November 1999 on Loud Records, and peaked in the Top 10 of the US album charts. The album was certified gold by the Recording Industry Association of America (RIAA) on December 20, 1999.

Background
Unlike the first album, it has no production input from the RZA, or any guest features from Ghostface Killah, for the album has its own theme. However, the album does feature Method Man and Masta Killa. Raekwon has stated that the title is an acronym for "I Move More Officially by Implementing Loyalty and Respect in the Youth". The album features affiliates American Cream Team, who would later become Ice Water.

Track listing

Charts

Weekly charts

Year-end charts

Certifications

References

Notes

External links
 Immobilarity at Discogs

Raekwon albums
1999 albums
Loud Records albums
Columbia Records albums
Albums produced by Pete Rock